Harald Christopher Rolfsen (born 3 May 1969) is a Norwegian luger, born in Oslo. He competed at the 1992 and 1994 Winter Olympics.

References

External links

1969 births
Living people
Sportspeople from Oslo
Norwegian male lugers
Olympic lugers of Norway
Lugers at the 1992 Winter Olympics
Lugers at the 1994 Winter Olympics